

Gustav Fehn (21 February 1892 – 5 June 1945) was a German general during World War II.

Fehn served in the Afrika Korps from November 1942 to January 1943, LXXVI Panzer Corps from July–August 1943, the XXI Army Corps from October 1943 - July 1944 and then the XV Mountain Corps in the Balkans until his surrender to Yugoslav partisans, who shot him without trial on 5 June 1945.

Awards
 Iron Cross (1914) 2nd and 1st Class 
 Iron Cross
 2nd Class (20 September 1939)
 1st Class (12 October 1939)
 Panzer Badge in Silver
 German Cross in Gold (7 July 19
 Knight's Cross of the Iron Cross on 5 August 1940 as Oberst and commander of Schützen-Regiment 33

References

Citations

Bibliography

 

1892 births
1945 deaths
Military personnel from Nuremberg
Generals of Panzer Troops
German Army personnel of World War I
People from the Kingdom of Bavaria
Executed military leaders
Recipients of the clasp to the Iron Cross, 1st class
Recipients of the Gold German Cross
Recipients of the Knight's Cross of the Iron Cross
Extrajudicial killings in World War II
German people executed abroad
People executed by Yugoslavia by firing squad
Executed people from Bavaria
Reichswehr personnel

Nazis executed in Yugoslavia